Sadu may refer to:

 Sadu, commune in Romania
 Sadu (Jiu), a river in Romania, tributary of the Jiu
 Sadu (Cibin), a river in Romania, tributary of the Cibin
 Kalateh-ye Sadu village in Iran
 Sadu language from China
 Sadashiv Shinde, known as "Sadu", an Indian cricketer
 Al Sadu, or Sadu, an embroidery form in geometrical shapes hand-woven by Bedouin people
 Sadu House in Kuwait, a museum of bedouin Sadu weaving, established by the Al Sadu society
 Sadu-Hem, one of the Ogdru Hem fictional creatures in the Hellboy universe
 Sadu Zai descendants of the Abakhel (Pashtun tribe)
 Ramkali Sadu, a Sikh composition

See also

 Sadus, an American thrash metal band
 Sadhu, a holy person in hinduism
 Sathu, an exclamation in Pali language